Patriocetus is an extinct genus of toothed whale.

References

Oligocene cetaceans
Prehistoric toothed whales
Prehistoric cetacean genera
Fossil taxa described in 1913